Poropanchax is a genus of small poeciliid fishes native to Africa.

Species
There are currently six recognized species in this genus:

 Poropanchax brichardi  (Poll, 1971) (Brichard's lampeye)
 Poropanchax luxophthalmus (Brüning, 1929)
 Poropanchax myersi (Poll, 1952) (Hummingbird lampeye)
 Poropanchax normani (C. G. E. Ahl, 1928) (Norman's lampeye)
 Poropanchax rancureli (Daget, 1965) (Rancurel's lampeye)
 Poropanchax stigmatopygus Wildekamp & Malumbres, 2004

A seventh species is recognized by Catalog of Fishes, but not by FishBase where considered a synonym of P. luxophthalmus:

 Poropanchax hannerzi (Scheel, 1968) (Hannerz' lampeye)

References

Poeciliidae
Fish of Africa
Freshwater fish genera
Ray-finned fish genera